This is a list of shopping malls in Hungary.

Shopping malls
 Agria Park, Eger (2008)
 Alba Plaza, Székesfehérvár (1999)
 Alba üzletház, Salgótarján (1999)
 Balaton Plaza, Veszprém (2004)
 Csaba Center, Békéscsaba (2001)
 Debrecen Plaza, Debrecen (1998)
 Debrecen Fórum, Debrecen (2008)
 Gyöngyház Plaza, Gyöngyös (2006)
 Győr Árkád, Győr (2006)
 Győr Plaza, Győr (1998)
 Kanizsa Plaza, Nagykanizsa (2000)
 Kaposvár Plaza, Kaposvár (2000)
 Keszthely Plaza, Keszthely (2003)
 Malom Központ, Kecskemét (2005)
 Miskolc Plaza, Miskolc (2000)
 Nyír Plaza, Nyíregyháza (2000)
 Nyíregyháza Korzó, Nyíregyháza (2008)
 Pécs Árkád, Pécs (2004)
 Pécs Plaza, Pécs (1999)
 Pelikán bevásárlóközpont, Szolnok (2008)
 Savaria Plaza, Szombathely (2001)
 Sió Plaza, Siófok (2012)
 Sopron Plaza, Sopron (1998)
 Szeged Árkád, Szeged (2011)
 Szeged Plaza, Szeged (2000)
 Szolnok Plaza, Szolnok (2001)
 Szinva Park, Miskolc (2000)
 Vértes Center, Tatabánya (2007)
 Zala Plaza, Zalaegerszeg (2002)

Budapest
 Allee (2009)
 Arena Plaza (2007)
 Árkád (2002)
 Asia Center (2003)
 Budagyöngye
 Campona
 Corvin Plaza (2010)
 Csepel Plaza (1997)
 Duna Plaza (1996)
 Etele Plaza (2020)
 GoBuda (Eurocenter until 2022) 
 Eleven Center
 Europeum
 KöKi Terminál (2011)
 Lurdy Ház (1998)
 Mammut I.
 Mammut II.
 MOM Park (2001)
 Pólus Center
 Savoya Park
 Shopmark (1997) (Europark until 2017)
 Sugár (1980)
 Újbuda Center
 WestEnd City Center (1999)

Former shopping malls
 Omega Park, Tatabánya (2007-2009)
 Pólus Dráva, Barcs (1998-2002)

Retail parks

Alpha Park

 Keszthely (2010) (GLA 14,000 m2)
 Sopron (2007) (GLA 15,000 m2)

Family Center

 Baja
 Budapest, Kőbánya
 Győr
 Hódmezővásárhely
 Keszthely
 Mohács
 Salgótarján
 Sopron
 Szolnok
 Szombathely

Park Center

 Debrecen (GLA 5,600 m2)
 Dunaújváros (*2)
 Kiskunhalas
 Miskolc (GLA 6,850 m2)
 Mosonmagyaróvár (GLA 4,500 m2)
 Nagykanizsa (GLA 5,060 m2)
 Siófok (GLA 4,600 m2)
 Szekszárd (GLA 5,600 m2)
 Zalaegerszeg (GLA 4,400 m2)

STOP SHOP

 Békéscsaba
 Budapest, Hűvösvölgy
 Budapest, Óbuda
 Budapest, Újpest
 Debrecen
 Érd
 Gödöllő
 Keszthely
 Miskolc
 Nagykanizsa
 Nyíregyháza
 Veszprém

Zone Bevásárlópark

 Ajka
 Budakeszi
 Dunaújváros
 Esztergom
 Kazincbarcika
 Kiskunhalas
 Pécs
 Szentes
 Székesfehérvár
 Szombathely
 Zalaegerszeg

See also
List of supermarket chains in Hungary

References

Hungary
Shopping malls